Air Force Ground  is a cricket ground in Katunayake, Sri Lanka. It has been the home of Sri Lanka Air Force Sports Club since 1985.

The ground was selected to host the third match of England Women's tour of Sri Lanka in 2018-19.

References

External links

Cricket grounds in Colombo
Multi-purpose stadiums in Sri Lanka